Maullín is Chilean town and commune in Llanquihue Province which is part of Los Lagos Region. The commune is located in at the outflow of Maullín River.

History
In 1674, there was a group of soldiers Basques in the present position of the commune.  Which allowed early detection of movements of the attacks of internal and external enemies (mostly Dutchmen and Englishmen who entered through the Cape Horn). In 1787 was rebuilt the fort by Colonel Francisco Hurtado. 

During the Independence of Chile, follows a slow passage of many years, until a September 15, 1882, by Supreme Decree grants the rank of municipality.

But the fate of Maullín and dynamic economic would be arrested by increasing industrialization and the opening of the Panama Canal.

Into the early twentieth century, large ships arrived bringing manufactured goods from Europe. Until 1946 was a place where wood was exploited in large numbers, with numerous sawmills and docks on the river for shipping large cargo timber and by embancamiento sands at the mouth of rivers.

Demographics
Of these, 6,896 (44.3%) lived in urban areas and 8,684 (55.7%) in rural areas. The population fell by 9% (1535 persons) between the 1992 and 2002 censuses.

Administration
As a commune, Maullín is a third-level administrative division of Chile administered by a municipal council, headed by an alcalde who is directly elected every four years. The 2008-2012 alcalde is Juan Cárcamo Cárcamo (PDC).

Within the electoral divisions of Chile, Maullín is represented in the Chamber of Deputies by Marisol Turres (UDI) and Patricio Vallespín (PDC) as part of the 57th electoral district, together with Puerto Montt, Cochamó and Calbuco. The commune is represented in the Senate by Camilo Escalona Medina (PS) and Carlos Kuschel Silva (RN) as part of the 17th senatorial constituency (Los Lagos Region).

Tourism
During the summer, Maullín, brings retro artists (hence the name Retro Maullín Festival), which is also unique in Chile. A 4 km from city, is the "Pangal Beach", known locally for its incomparable beauty, peace and serenity to be found. It is a beautiful place to spend the summer. During the months of February, in Pangal beach, people all over the south of Chile are attending the "Festival Traditionalist", famous for its typical gastronomy, beliefs, dances and songs.

References

External links
  Municipality of Maullín
Map
Ciudad del Río y Tierra Verde

Communes of Chile
Populated places in Llanquihue Province
1674 establishments in the Spanish Empire
Coasts of Los Lagos Region